Ujung Water Palace is a former palace in Karangasem Regency, Bali. Now, this palace also known as Ujung Park or Sukasada Park.  It is located approximately 5 kilometres from Amlapura. In the Dutch East Indies era, this place known by the name Waterpaleis. The palace has three large pools. In the middle of the pool, there is the main building named Gili Bale, connected to the edge of the pool by bridge.

History

Ujung Water Palace was built by the King of Karangasem, I Gusti Bagus Jelantik, who holds Anak Agung Agung Ketut Karangasem Anglurah. This palace is a privately owned by Karangasem Royal. It was built in 1909 on the initiative of Anak Agung Anglurah. The architect was a Dutch van Den Hentz and a Chinese Loto Ang. This development also involves the undagi (Balinese architect). This palace is actually the development from Dirah Pool which has been built in 1901 The construction was completed in 1921. In 1937, Taman Ujung Karangasem inaugurated with a marble stele inscribed with the text in Latin and Balinese script and also two languages, Malay and Balinese.  It  was destroyed almost entirely by the eruption of Mount Agung in 1963 and earthquake in 1975.

References

External links

Palaces in Bali
Tourist attractions in Bali